Podgórski is a Polish surname. Notable people with the surname include:

Podgórski sisters, Stephania and Helena
Anthony Podgorski (1903-1987), American businessman and politician
Pete Podgorski (born 1953), American boxer and boxing official
Stanisław Podgórski (1905–1981), Polish cyclist
Tomasz Podgórski (born 1985), Polish footballer

Polish-language surnames